Jianguomen Inner Street is a major street in urban Beijing. It forms part of the extended Chang'an Avenue.

Its path begins after the Dongdan intersection heading east until Jianguomen Bridge.

During its short run, it crosses with the intersection to the Beijing railway station.

The Beijing International Hotel also lies along its track, as does a main postal office and the building of China customs.

The street ends near the Beijing Ancient Observatory.

Line 1 of the Beijing subway runs along the route.

Jianguomen Nei Street Link - Beijing Ming Dynasty Observatory Virtual Tour

Streets in Beijing